Chickasaw National Wildlife Refuge is a  National Wildlife Refuge located along the Mississippi River in the northwestern part of Lauderdale County in West Tennessee.  The area is noted for a diversity of wildlife, notably white-tailed deer, wild turkey, beaver, and waterfowl. Established in 1985, it occupies land that was once owned by the Anderson Tully Inc of Memphis, Tennessee.

References
Refuge website

Protected areas of Lauderdale County, Tennessee
National Wildlife Refuges in Tennessee
Protected areas on the Mississippi River